The 2017 Canadian Championship was a soccer tournament hosted and organized by the Canadian Soccer Association. It was the tenth edition of the annual Canadian Championship.

The 2017 edition saw the introduction of a rule that required three players to be named in the starting eleven of each participating team who are eligible (and have declared their intention, if they had otherwise played for another national team) to play for the Canada men's national soccer team.

Due to the restructuring of the CONCACAF Champions League, the winner of the 2017 Canadian Championship would have advanced to a playoff against Toronto FC, the winner of the 2016 Canadian Championship, to be played in Toronto on August 9, 2017, for a place in the 2018 CONCACAF Champions League. However, as Toronto FC won the 2017 Canadian Championship, no playoff game was necessary, and Toronto earned a place in the 2018 CONCACAF Champions League automatically.

Tournament bracket

Matches

Preliminary round 

Ottawa Fury FC won 4–2 on aggregate.

Semifinals 

Toronto FC won 5–2 on aggregate.

Montreal Impact won 5–4 on aggregate.

Final 

Toronto FC won 3–2 on aggregate.

Goalscorers 

Own goals

References 

2017
2017 in Canadian soccer
2017 domestic association football cups